Ronke Odusanya , (born 3 May 1979) is a Nigerian Yoruba-language film actress, film producer and stage performer.

Early life
Ronke Odusanya was born on 3 May 1979 in Ogun State, Nigeria.

Education 
Odusanya began her education at the St. Benedict Nursery & Primary School and went on to Federal Government Girls College, Akure. She attended  Olabisi Onabanjo University, earning a degree in Mass communication.

Career
She began her professional acting career at 16 years old after graduation. She was named "Flakky Idi Dowo" after her role in Fathia Balogun's movie as "Folake" in 2006. Odusanya is featured in Oga Bello's "Kerikeri". She made her Nollywood debut feature in the 2001 Yoruba film Baba Ologba.
She has featured in several Nigerian films, including ''Jenifa which she played the role of Becky, Twisted, A Girl's Note Introducing the Kujus where she played the role of Maupe, which is available on streaming platform prime videos, and among others. She was nominated for Best Actress in Leading Role (Yoruba) at 2017 Best of Nollywood Awards for her role in the film Ailatunse, also  Best Yoruba Movie AMVCA 2020 nomination for the movie Ajoji godogbo

Selected filmography
Baba Ologba (2001)
 Twisted (2007)
 Jenifa (2008)
 Láròdá òjò (2008)
 Eekan soso (2009)
 Emi Nire Kan (2009)
 Astray (Isina)  (2016) 
 Gangan (2016)
 A Girl's Note (2016)
Asake Oni Bread (2016)
The Stunt (2017)
Ayomide (2017)
Obsession (2017)
Flakky Ijaya (2017)
Ailatunse (2017)
Olorire (2018)
Owo Agbara (2018)
Oronro (2018)
Omije Omorewa 
Introducing The Kujus (2020)
Ainiwa (2021)
The Cokers (2021)
Sparrow (2021)
Body bag (2022)
Different Strokes (2022)
Love or Death (2022)
Nkan Inu Igi (2022)
Love Trap (2022)
Onika (2022)

Awards

See also 

 List of Yoruba People
 List of Nigerian actresses

References

External links

21st-century Nigerian actresses
Living people
1973 births
Actresses from Ogun State
Actresses in Yoruba cinema
Nigerian Christians
Nigerian film actresses
Nigerian film producers
Nigerian stage actresses
Nigerian women film producers
Olabisi Onabanjo University alumni
Yoruba actresses
Yoruba women filmmakers